Symphlebia venusta is a moth in the subfamily Arctiinae. It was described by Paul Dognin in 1921. It is found in Peru and Bolivia.

References

Natural History Museum Lepidoptera generic names catalog

Moths described in 1921
venusta